The McLaren M8A was a race car developed by driver Bruce McLaren and his Bruce McLaren Motor Racing team for their entry in 1968 Can-Am season. The M8A and its successors dominated Can-Am racing for four consecutive Can-Am seasons, until the arrival of the Porsche 917.

Development

M8A
The M8A was an evolution of the previous M6A design, and featured an all-aluminium seven-litre Chevrolet big-block V8 as a semi-stressed chassis member. The engines were built by Gary Knutson and initially developed 620 bhp. Two complete M8A race cars and one spare tub were built.

M8B
The M8B was developed for the 1969 Can-Am season. The most noticeable difference was that the rear wing was now mounted high on pylons, like the Chaparral 2E. The wing mounting pylons passed through the bodywork to attach directly to the suspension uprights. This arrangement allowed McLaren to run softer springs than would have been required had the massive rear wing been attached to the bodywork. The body was also widened in order to fit one-inch wider wheels, now 15 x 11 front and 15 x 16 rear. The 1969 engine was a shorter stroke, larger bore version of the 1968 engine. Two complete M8B race cars and one spare tub were built using parts from the three M8As.

M8C

The M8C was developed as a customer version of the M8A. Fifteen M8Cs were built by Trojan. They featured a more conventional chassis that did not use the engine as a stressed member, giving the customers more freedom in choosing an engine. The M8C was available with a variety of different engines, including a Chevrolet big-block, a Chevrolet small-block, a Ford big-block, a Ford small-block, and even a Ford-Cosworth DFV F1 engine.

M8D
The M8D was developed for the 1970 Can-Am season. The high strut-mounted rear wing of the M8B had been banned by Can-Am, so the M8D's rear wing was mounted low on fins, earning the car the nickname "Batmobile".
Bruce McLaren was tragically fatally injured in an accident whilst testing the M8D at the Goodwood Circuit on 2 June 1970, when his car crashed on the Lavant Straight just before Woodcote corner after a section of the rear bodywork came adrift at speed.

M8E

The M8E was a customer car based on the M8B and built by Trojan. The high pylon-mounted rear wings of the M8B were replaced with a lower wing to comply with the ban on high-mounted wings.

M8F

The M8F was developed for the 1971 Can-Am season and featured an 8.1-liter (488 CID) (and later upscaled 8.3-liter (509 CID)) big-block Chevrolet V8 engine.

M8FP
The M8FP was the Trojan-built customer version of the M8F.

Racing history

1968
Already known as "The Bruce and Denny Show" due to Bruce McLaren and Denny Hulme winning five of the six Can-Am races in the 1967 season, 1968 started off with an equally dominant performance by McLaren and Hulme in the new M8A at the Road America Can-Am race. Hulme won the race with McLaren second. The M8B faltered at the next race in Bridgehampton, where both cars retired due to engine failure. Following the double retirement, the team reduced the compression ratio of their engines to 12:1, from 13:1, trading horsepower for increased reliability.

McLaren roared back with another 1-2 finish in Edmonton, but then could only manage second and fifth in rainy conditions at Laguna Seca. It was beginning to look like the competition had caught up with McLaren.

The tide turned for the last two races, with the team's mechanics able to extract more power from their engine. Bruce McLaren won in the searing heat at Riverside and Denny Hulme won in Las Vegas. Hulme won the 1968 championship with 35 points, and McLaren finished second with 24 points.

1969

1970
Bruce McLaren crashed the M8D on the Lavant straight just before Woodcote corner at Goodwood Circuit in England on 2 June 1970. He had been testing his new M8D when the rear bodywork came adrift at speed. The loss of aerodynamic downforce destabilised the car, which spun, left the track, and hit a bunker used as a flag station. McLaren lost his life in the accident. The car would go on to win the opening round of the championship.

1971
Peter Revson won the 1971 Can Am championship in a Team McLaren M8F.

Post-1971
The works McLaren team switched to the new M20 for 1972, but M8s continued to be raced by private entrants. François Cevert won at Donnybrooke in 1972 in an M8F entered by "Young American Racing". This would be the last win in Can-Am for the McLaren M8.

References

M8A
Can-Am cars